This is a list of banks in Slovakia as of 2022.

Central banks
 Eximbanka SR 
 National Bank of Slovakia

Commercial and savings banks
 365.bank, owned by Poštová banka 
 Československá obchodná banka, owned by KBC Bank 
 mBank, owned by BRE Bank SA, member of Commerzbank 
 Poštová banka, majority-owned by J&T Group 
 Prima banka, member of Penta Investments 
 Privatbanka, member of Penta Investments 
 Prvá stavebná sporiteľňa 
 Raiffeisen Bank, owned by Tatra banka 
 Slovenská sporiteľňa, member of Erste Bank 
 Slovenská záručná a rozvojová banka 
 Tatra banka, member of Raiffeisen Bank International 
 Všeobecná úverová banka, member of Intesa Sanpaolo 
 Wüstenrot stavebná sporiteľňa

Branch offices of foreign banks
 Banco Cofidis, S.A. 
 BKS Bank AG 
 BNP Paribas Personal Finance SA, member of BNP Paribas 
 Citibank Europe plc, member of Citigroup 
 Commerzbank AG 
 Fio Banka 
 ING Bank N.V., member of ING Group 
 J&T Banka, member of J&T Group 
 KDB Bank Europe Ltd., owned by Korea Development Bank 
 Komerční banka Bratislava, owned by Komerční Banka (member of Société Générale) 
 Oberbank 
 UniCredit Bank Czech Republic and Slovakia, a.s. (legal entity registered in Czech Republic), member of UniCredit Group

Defunct banks
 AG Banka
 Devín banka
 Dexia, merged with Prima Banka
 Istrobanka, merged with Československá obchodná banka
 OTP Bank, merged with Československá obchodná banka
 Sberbank, merged with Prima Banka
 Slovenská kreditná banka
 UniCredit Bank Slovakia, merged with UniCredit Bank Czech Republic and Slovakia
 Volksbank, merged with Sberbank
 ZUNO Bank AG

References

Sources
National Bank of Slovakia official site

Slovakia
 
Banks
Slovakia